Pamela Hardy Peters (born 28 March 1942) is an Australian linguist. She is an Emeritus Professor of Linguistics at Macquarie University, Sydney. She is a member of the Australian Broadcasting Corporation's Standing Committee on Spoken English. She has published several books on Australian and international English usage, including The Cambridge Guide to English Usage (2004) and The Cambridge Guide to Australian English Usage (2007). She was a member of the editorial committee of the Macquarie Dictionary.

References

1942 births
Living people
Academic staff of Macquarie University